Artūras Vieta (born May 31, 1961) is a Lithuanian sprint canoeist, born in Šiauliai. He won ten medals at the ICF Canoe Sprint World Championships with three golds (K-4 500 m: 1987, K-4 10000 m: 1989, 1990), three silvers (K-1 1000 m: 1983, K-2 1000 m: 1989, 1990; K-4 500 m: 1983, K-4 1000 m: 1985), and two bronzes (K-4 1000 m: 1985, 1987). At the 1992 Summer Olympics in Barcelona, he competed for Lithuania and finished ninth in both the K-1 500 m and the K-1 1000 m events.

References

1961 births
Canoeists at the 1992 Summer Olympics
Lithuanian male canoeists
Soviet male canoeists
Living people
Olympic canoeists of Lithuania
ICF Canoe Sprint World Championships medalists in kayak
Sportspeople from Šiauliai
Honoured Masters of Sport of the USSR